Golfito is a canton in the Puntarenas province of Costa Rica. The head city is in Golfito district.

History 
Golfito was created on 10 June 1949 by decree 532.

Geography 
Golfito has an area of  km² and a mean elevation of  metres.

The canton encompasses the southernmost Pacific coast of Costa Rica, north from Punta Gorda Hill at the Panama border. It includes non-contiguous land on both sides of the Golfo Dulce and the entire southern portion of the Osa Peninsula.

Districts 
The canton of Golfito is subdivided into the following districts:
 Golfito
 Guaycará
 Pavón

Puerto Jiménez was the second district of the canton, which was segregated to become Puerto Jiménez canton on 8 April 2022.

Demographics 

For the 2011 census, Golfito had a population of  inhabitants.

Transportation

Road transportation 
The canton is covered by the following road routes:

References 

Cantons of Puntarenas Province
Populated places in Puntarenas Province